Euschistus obscurus, the pale-lined stink bug, is a species of stink bug in the family Pentatomidae. It is found in the Caribbean Sea, Central America, and North America.

References

External links

 

Articles created by Qbugbot
Insects described in 1817
Pentatomini